Cleptomorpha is a genus of millipedes belonging to the family Paradoxosomatidae. 

Species:
 Cleptomorpha sumatrana Golovatch, 1997

References

Paradoxosomatidae